Elmacık may refer to:

 Elmacık, Adıyaman, village in Adıyaman Province, Turkey
 Elmacık, Aksaray, village in Aksaray Province, Turkey
 Elmacık, Çanakkale
 Elmacık, Gümüşova
 Elmacık, Kemer